Shoplet is an online retailer of business products, servicing the continental United States and United Kingdom.

Shoplet is headquartered in downtown New York City and maintains offices in the United Kingdom. In 2010, Shoplet was listed in Internet Retailer Magazine's Top 500 online sellers.

Shoplet's main competitors in the online office supply vertical are Staples, Office Depot, Office Max and Quill.

History 
Tony Ellison, Shoplet's founder and present CEO, conceived of Shoplet as an online business model in 1994. In 1996, Shoplet.com was officially launched and open for business. Originally, Shoplet sold a wide array of products, ranging from yachts and cars to computer hardware. In 1997, Ellison decided to hone Shoplet's focus on business products and materials and expanded Shoplet's selection of products to 100,000 items. Shoplet exceeded sales of $100 million in 2009.

Shoplet expanded its programs and services to the United Kingdom in June 2013.

References

External links 
 

American companies established in 1994
Retail companies established in 1994
Office supply retailers of the United States
Online retailers of the United States
Companies based in New York City